The qualification progress to the 2013 CONCACAF Women's U-17 Championship is a series of association football matches to determine the teams joining automatic qualified Canada, Mexico and USA in the final tournament. There are to separately organized tournaments, one by the Caribbean Football Union, CFU, and one by the Central American Football Union, UNCAF.

CFU

First round
The first round is played from 5 to 26 August 2013 in the US Virgin Islands. Four teams played in each group. The top two team, plus the best two third-placed teams advanced to the next round.

Group I 
Played from 5 to 12 August in Puerto Rico. Originally Aruba was drawn into this group, they apparently withdrew.

|}

Group II 
Group 2 is played in Trinidad and Tobago from 12 to 19 August.

|}

Group III 
Played from 19 to 26 August in the Dominican Republic.

|}

Second round
The final round is played from 20 to 29 September 2013 at Port-au-Prince, Haiti. Eight teams will take part and three will move on to the final tournament.

Group A

|}

Group B

|}

Knockout stage

UNCAF
In Central America four teams were drawn into two matches. El Salvador and Guatemala qualified to the final tournament.

|}

References

External links
Under 17s – Women, CONCACAF.com
Fútbol Femenino Sub-17, UNCAFut.com 
Women's U17, CFUfootball.org
Final round results

Qualifying
2013 in women's association football
2013 in youth sport
2013